Flodin is a surname of Swedish origin. Notable people with the surname include:

Christer Flodin (born 1948), Swedish television actor
Hilda Flodin (1877–1958), Finnish artist
Johan Flodin (born 1967), Swedish rower
Louise Flodin (1828–1923), Swedish journalist, typographer, feminist and publisher 
May-Louise Flodin (1934–2011), Swedish model and beauty queen
Patrik Flodin (born 1984), Swedish rally driver
Ulrika Flodin (born 1975), Swedish middle- and long-distance runner

References

Surnames of Swedish origin